Church of Pentecost in Vinkovci is a Serbian Orthodox church in eastern Croatia. The church is one of two in the Eparchy of Osječko polje and Baranja that is dedicated to Pentecost. The original church, built in 1793, was destroyed in 1991 during the Croatian War of Independence, and an identical church was rebuilt in its place, in the period between 2007 and 2012.

History
Construction of original Church of Pentecost in Vinkovci was completed in 1793. In Vinkovci Serbian Orthodox Church in 1821 was baptized Josif Runjanin, composer of Lijepa naša domovino (Croatian national anthem) and Sava Šumanović.

Destruction and rebuilding
After war planes of the Yugoslav People's Army bombed targets in the center of Vinkovci on 24 September 1991, they badly damaged the local Catholic rectory. A day later, in retaliation, the old Church of Pentecost was mined and razed to the ground after being robbed. The iconostasis and inventory was stolen and the church bells were missing for a long period of time. A parking lot stood in the church's place until the beginning of reconstruction.

During the initial phase of negotiations on the renewal with the local authorities, a wooden cross was erected at the location of the old church. In 2007, the building of a new, identical Church of Pentecost began. The final blessing and reinstatement in function happened in 2012. In the meantime, the church restored a part of its looted original iconostasis, and an anonymous source reported the location of the old bells, which were then put in function.

See also
Eparchy of Osječko polje and Baranja
Vinkovci
Serbs of Croatia
List of Serbian Orthodox churches in Croatia

References

Vinkovci
Churches completed in 1793
Churches completed in 2012
Rebuilt buildings and structures in Croatia
18th-century Serbian Orthodox church buildings
21st-century Serbian Orthodox church buildings
Destroyed churches in Croatia
Rebuilt churches
1793 establishments in Europe
Vinkovci